Belenois calypso, the Calypso white or Calypso caper white, is a butterfly in the family Pieridae. It is found in Senegal, the Gambia, Guinea-Bissau, Guinea, Sierra Leone, Liberia, Ivory Coast, Burkina Faso, Ghana, Togo, Benin, Nigeria, Cameroon, the Republic of the Congo, the Central African Republic, the Democratic Republic of the Congo, Angola, Uganda, Kenya and Tanzania. The habitat consists of forests. The species occasionally migrates.

The larvae feed on Semirestis paniculata, Maerua, Cadaba, Capparis and Ritchiea species.

Subspecies
B. c. calypso (Senegal, the Gambia, Guinea-Bissau. Guinea, Sierra Leone, Liberia, Ivory Coast, Burkina Faso, Ghana, Togo, Benin, Nigeria)
B. c. dentigera Butler, 1888 (Cameroon, Congo, Central African Republic, Democratic Republic of the Congo, north-western Angola)
B. c. marlieri Berger, 1981 (Democratic Republic of the Congo)
B. c. minor Talbot, 1943 (Uganda, Kenya (west of the Rift Valley), north-western Tanzania)

References

External links
Seitz, A. Die Gross-Schmetterlinge der Erde 13: Die Afrikanischen Tagfalter. Plate XIII 13 
Seitz, A. Die Gross-Schmetterlinge der Erde 13: Die Afrikanischen Tagfalter. Plate XIII 15 as dentigera

Butterflies described in 1773
Pierini
Butterflies of Africa
Taxa named by Dru Drury